The Downtown Aledo Historic District is a national historic district located in downtown Aledo, Illinois. The district includes 75 contributing buildings and a park. The majority of the buildings are commercial structures, but the district also includes the city's Chicago, Burlington and Quincy Railroad station and both the city's and Mercer County's major government buildings. Development in the district began in the 1850s, and the oldest surviving buildings date from the following decade. The district includes examples of many prominent American architectural styles from the mid-19th century onward; the most prevalent styles are Classical Revival, Romanesque Revival, and Italianate.

The district was added to the National Register of Historic Places on June 7, 2016. Two buildings in the district, the Mercer County Courthouse and Mercer County Jail, are listed independently in the National Register.

Architectural Styles

Italianate 

There are eleven buildings of the  District identified as Italianate. Examples of the Italianate style in the District include Detwiler Bros. Hardware Store at 118 E Main St, the Marquis Bros. Building at 201 E Main St, and the former Buggie and Shay Shop at 106 S College Ave. Locally, this style of architecture was popular from 1880–1913.

Romanesque Revival 
There are thirteen buildings of the District identified as Romanesque Revival. Examples include the Union Hall Building at 113 S College Ave, 213 S College Ave, and 109-113 E Main St. Locally, this style of was popular from 1870–1907.

Second Empire 

The Button House at 101 N College Ave is the only example of the Second Empire style in the District. The Button House was built in 1868.

Stick Style 

The Chicago, Burlington, & Quincy Railroad Depot at 204 SE 2nd Ave is the only example of Stick Style in the District. The CB&Q Depot was built in 1869.

Italian Renaissance 
There are two buildings of the District identified as Italian Renaissance. The two examples are the service stations at 112 S College Ave, and 222 E Main St. These buildings were built from 1928–1940.

Classical Revival 

There are 25 buildings of the District identified as Classical Revival. Of the 25 buildings, four are Early Classical Revival and 21 are Late Classical Revival. Examples include the Mercer Carnegie Library at 200 N College Ave, the Wallen Block at 114 E Main St, and the rear of 118 E Main St. Locally, the Early Classical Revival style was popular from 1875–1880, while the Late Classical Revival style was popular from 1889–1938.

Jacobethan 

The Mercer County Jail at 309 S College Avenue is the only example of the Jacobethan style in the District. The jail was built in 1909.

Neoclassical 

The Farmers National Bank at 101 E Main St is the only example of the Neoclassical style in the District. The bank building was built in 1917.

Art Deco 
The Mercer County Farm Bureau at 206 SE 3rd St is the only example of the Art Deco style in the District. The building was built in 1940.

Moderne 
There are four buildings in the District identified as Moderne. Examples include the Standard Oil Stations at 222 W Main St and 112 S College Ave. Locally, this style was popular circa 1940.

New Traditional 
The McCreedy Building at 107-109 N College Ave is the only example of the New Traditional style in the District. The building was built in 1938 and continues to be popular to present day.

Contemporary 
There are five buildings in the District identified as Contemporary. Examples include the Tastee-Freez at 300 SE 3rd St, the Veterans of Foreign Wars Post at 106 SW 3rd Ave, and the Farmer's State Bank of Western Illinois at 201 S College Ave. Additionally, there are eleven buildings with Contemporary style false-fronts in the District. Examples include the W.C. Galloway Grocery Store at 119 S College Ave, 115 E Main St, and 116 NW 2nd Ave. Locally, this style was popular from 1950–1995.

Building Type

Commercial Blocks: One & Two Part 
Two or more story commercial blocks may be classified as One-Part Commercial if the facade can be read as a single design element, with no projecting cornice or other strong horizontal design element dividing the first floor from the upper floors.

There are 49 Commercial Blocks in the District. Examples of the Commercial Block type can be found on the north side of the 100-block of E Main St or the west side of the 100 and 200-blocks of S College Ave.

Temple-Front 
Modeled after the ancient Greek and Roman temples, these buildings are typically two to three stories in height. They are distinguished by a portico of four or more columns extending across the facade or by a recessed entry front by twin columns set in between an enframing wall.

The Farmers National Bank at 101 E Main St is the only example of the Temple-Front building type in the District.

False-Front 
False-Front is an applied or fake front facade. They are identifiable by the extension of the applied front facade above the building's roofline and lack of depth to the storefront.

There are eleven buildings with false-fronts in the District. Examples include the W.C. Galloway Grocery Store at 119 S College Ave, 115 E Main St, and 116 NW 2nd Ave.

Freestanding 
Freestanding buildings have architectural treatment on two or more sides. The structure may occupy an entire city block and be surrounded by parking.

There are six Freestanding buildings in the District. Examples of the Freestanding building type are the National Bank of Aledo building at 201 W Main St, Farmer's State Bank of Western Illinois at 201 S College, and Frontier Communications at 206 SE 3rd Ave.

Gas Stations and Other Road-Related Buildings 
Automobile service garages are simple buildings sometimes with an office or storage above. These buildings are often masonry construction with a barrel vault or bowstring truss roof.

There are ten road-related buildings in the District. Examples are the Standard Oil Stations at 222 W Main St and 112 S College Ave, and the filling and service station at 222 E Main St.

Map of Historic District Boundary 
{
  "type": "FeatureCollection",
  "features": [
    {
      "type": "Feature",
      "properties": {},
      "geometry": {
        "type": "Polygon",
        "coordinates": [
          [
            [
              -90.7480573654175,
              41.19906986234322
            ],
            [
              -90.74803590774538,
              41.19950578404175
            ],
            [
              -90.7464051246643,
              41.19945734844086
            ],
            [
              -90.7463836669922,
              41.19990941265532
            ],
            [
              -90.74814319610596,
              41.19994170283687
            ],
            [
              -90.74816465377808,
              41.20053906832206
            ],
            [
              -90.74683427810669,
              41.20052292338063
            ],
            [
              -90.74685573577882,
              41.2016692043246
            ],
            [
              -90.74713468551636,
              41.2016692043246
            ],
            [
              -90.74711322784424,
              41.20212125326128
            ],
            [
              -90.74859380722046,
              41.20213739780842
            ],
            [
              -90.74857234954834,
              41.20289618703102
            ],
            [
              -90.74917316436769,
              41.202912331386976
            ],
            [
              -90.74915170669557,
              41.2034612371198
            ],
            [
              -90.75035333633424,
              41.20349352554893
            ],
            [
              -90.75039625167848,
              41.20173378293531
            ],
            [
              -90.75155496597291,
              41.201749927578014
            ],
            [
              -90.75157642364503,
              41.200861966314164
            ],
            [
              -90.75039625167848,
              41.20087811117193
            ],
            [
              -90.75043916702272,
              41.19995784792167
            ],
            [
              -90.74977397918703,
              41.19997399300251
            ],
            [
              -90.74979543685915,
              41.199602655136005
            ],

            [
              -90.74981153011322,
              41.19939301985297
            ],
            [
              -90.75046062469484,
              41.19940639011368
            ],
            [
              -90.75044989585878,
              41.19906733963974
            ],
            [
              -90.7480573654175,
              41.19906986234322
            ]
          ]
        ]
      }
    }
  ]
}

Table of Contributing Structures

References

National Register of Historic Places in Mercer County, Illinois
Italianate architecture in Illinois
Romanesque Revival architecture in Illinois
Neoclassical architecture in Illinois
Historic districts on the National Register of Historic Places in Illinois